Lasse Jensen (born 6 September 1984) is a Danish professional golfer who has played on the European Tour.

Nordic Golf League
In 2009, he won the Order of Merit for the Nordic Golf League.

Challenge Tour
He has two runner-up finishes on the Challenge Tour at the 2012 and 2014 Barclays Kenya Open.

European Tour
He qualified for the 2013 European Tour by finishing on the final number at European Tour Qualifying School.

For the 2015 European Tour, Jensen finished in 144th place on the Order of Merit, but retained his playing card by way of European Tour Qualifying School.

Jensen finished 2nd at the 2016 Nordea Masters. This finish qualified him for the 2016 Open Championship.

Professional wins (8)

EPD Tour wins (1)

Nordic Golf League wins (7)

Playoff record
Challenge Tour playoff record (0–1)

Results in major championships

CUT = missed the half-way cut
"T" = tied

See also
2012 European Tour Qualifying School graduates
2014 European Tour Qualifying School graduates
2015 European Tour Qualifying School graduates

References

External links

Danish male golfers
European Tour golfers
People from Hillerød Municipality
Sportspeople from Copenhagen
1984 births
Living people